Out of the Dust is a children's verse novel by Karen Hesse, first published on January 1, 1997.

Summary 
Billie Jo begins with how her father wanted to have a son instead of a daughter. He still loves her but treats her like the son he never had, rough and tough. The opening of the book also describes the dust storms causing trouble on farms, a vital part of the rural farming community, for it is a homestead area. As dust storms swoop in and steal any hope of profit from wheat, the US government makes moves to try to help the area. FDR's New Deal is a series of programs to assist farmers (along with the rest of the country). Daddy thinks about taking a loan to plant some wheat, which Ma advises against, as more dust comes.

One day while Billie Jo's pregnant mother is making breakfast, her father leaves a pail of kerosene next to the stove and then goes out into the fields. Mistaking it for water, her mother sets it on fire while trying to make coffee. Horrified, she runs out to fields in search of her husband. Thinking the house may catch fire, Billie Jo throws the can of kerosene out the door. Unfortunately, her mother is running back to the house at the same time, and the kerosene sets her clothes ablaze. Billie Jo beats the flames with her bare hands in an attempt to save her mother and unborn sibling. Her mother is taken inside and treated by the local doctor, but she never again looks like "Ma" to Billie Jo since she is unrecognizable through her burns. Billie Jo's own hands are badly burned as well, swollen and dripping pus. When her father is grieving one night, he takes the emergency money and gets drunk at Guymon. Billie Jo is left trying to give water (using immensely burned and swollen hands) to her burned and injured mother.

In the chapter Devoured,  Billie Jo's mother dies while giving birth to her son. The baby is delivered and lives for a few moments until he too is pronounced dead as well. Buried on top of a hill, Billie Jo names him Franklin after the president, her father at a loss for words.

Billie Jo and her father begin to grow apart from each other; he does not even seem like her father anymore. After the deaths, Billie Jo stops calling her father "Daddy." Hands scarred and burned, Billie Jo is left unable to play piano, one of the few joys that had remained in her life (like her mother). Time goes on, and she begins to notice spots on her father's face, similar to those on her grandfather when he had skin cancer. After trying to return to her former lifestyle, Billie Jo becomes desperate to get out of the dust, so she gets up and leaves one night with only a handful of biscuits.

She hitchhikes on a train, and a homeless and smelly man comes up to her. Talking for a while, he shows her a picture of his family before she falls asleep. She awakens to find that her biscuits are gone, but the picture that the man had of his family is left in its place. It is here she learns of her sense of belonging, and it all becomes clear to her.

After a week, Billie Jo returns home and convinces her father to see a doctor. She calls him "Daddy" for the first time since the incident. The two even start to gain each other's trust again. She then meets Louise, a woman who stayed with her father while Billie was on the run. Billie Jo respects Louise because Louise knows how to cope with "two redheads" and not "step on the toes of a ghost". Billie Jo and Louise just talk, and her father eventually ends up courting Louise.

Reception 
Out of the Dust has received many accolades:

 1998, Newbery Medal 
 1998, Scott O'Dell Award
 1998, American Library Association, Best Books for Young Adults
 1999, Dorothy Canfield Fisher Children's Book Award nominee

References 

Newbery Medal–winning works
1997 American novels
1997 children's books
1997 poetry books
Children's historical novels
Children's verse novels
American children's novels
Novels set in Oklahoma
Great Depression novels
Fiction set in 1934
Fiction set in 1935